Duane Steven Wylie (born November 10, 1950) is a Canadian former ice hockey center. He was drafted by the New York Rangers with the 81st pick in the 1970 draft. He would go on to play 14 NHL games with the Chicago Black Hawks. Though he was born in Spokane, Washington he was raised in Moose Jaw, Saskatchewan. Wylie is one of five Spokane-born hockey players to make it to the NHL.

References

External links

1950 births
Living people
American men's ice hockey centers
Canadian ice hockey centres
Chicago Blackhawks players
Sportspeople from Moose Jaw
Ice hockey people from Washington (state)
New York Rangers draft picks
Sportspeople from Spokane, Washington
Ice hockey people from Saskatchewan